Ignacy Loga-Sowiński (January 20, 1914 – December 10, 1992) was a Polish trade union activist and politician. He was a member of the Central Committee and Politburo of the Polish United Workers' Party. He was a member of the State National Council from 1956 to 1971. He also served as the deputy chairman of the council and was an ambassador of the Polish People's Republic to Turkey from 1971 to 1978.

Early life
He is the son of Władysław and Honorata née Misiak, his father being an agricultural laborer.  He received elementary education. Ignacy's profession was a bricklayer in the pre-war period, he lived in Łódź during that time.<ref name = "spr300"> Reports of the Łódź voivode. 1938, Cz. 2 '; Łódź 2014, p. 300 (List of judgments for September 1938); sentenced by the judgment of the District Court in Łódź on August 16, 1938, to 2 years in prison and the loss of civil rights for 5 years (with arrest from April 28, 1938), on the basis of art. 97, § 1, in connection with Art. 93 § 2 .</ref> He was involved in the Communist Youth Association (KZMP) and joined the Communist Party of Poland in 1935. In February 1938, he was arrested during a search that revealed a manuscript of communist appearance. During the years 1938–1939, he was imprisoned for political reasons. During the 1939 Invasion of Poland, he was released from prison.

Career
1940s
During the occupation of Poland, he was active in the underground resistance. He was together with Mieczysław Moczar a co-founder of the organization Front Fighting for Our and Your Freedom, which after the uprising of Polish Workers Party transforms into its cells. Afterward, he worked in the apparatus of the Central Committee of the Polish Workers' Party. He then became a Representative of the Central Committee of the PPR for the Lublin region from June to July 1944.

Starting from January 1945, he was a representative of the Provisional Government for Łódź Voivodeship. Following that month, he became First Secretary of the Provincial Committee of the Polish Workers Party in Łódź, and from 1946 he was a part of the Łódź Committee of the Polish Workers Party. In 1943, he served as a deputy member of the Central Committee of the PPR and in that same year, a member of the Central Committee of the PPR. He served these last two positions to the year, 1948. In the year 1944, he was made a member of the Krajowej Narodowej and in 1947, made a part of the Sejm Ustawodawczy of Poland.

From 1949, he was associated with trade unions: he was the chairman of the District Trade Union Commission and the Provincial Council of Trade Unions in Wrocław. He was also the secretary of the Association of Trade Unions, serving all of these roles until 1956.

1950s
In 1956, he became chairman of the Central Council of Trade Union. The following year, he was elected to the State Council of Poland in 1957. Whilst he was a member. 
In the year 1958, he was the deputy chairman of the National Committee National Unity Front and would serve that role until 1971.

1960s
He was elected to the position of Deputy Chairman of the State Council of Poland in 1965.
In June 1968 he became a member of the Honorary Committee of the 500th anniversary of the birth of Mikołaj Kopernik.

1970s
Loga-Sowiński joined the workers' uprising from December 14 to 22 in the year 1970. During this time he was acting chairman of the central council of the trade union federation CRZZ, after which he was replaced by Władysław Kruczek. In the year 1971, he was made an ambassador of the People's Republic of Poland to Turkey until the year 1978.

Death
He died in 1992 due to natural causes. He was buried next to his mother, Honorata, in Powązki Military Cemetery in Warsaw.

Awards
Order of the Builders of People's Poland
Order of the Banner of Work
Gold Cross of Merit (Poland)
Order of the Cross of Grunwald
Medal of the 10th Anniversary of People's Poland
Medal of Ludwik Waryński
Badge "For Merits for Zbowid"

References

 Bibliography 
 Leksykon Historii Polski, Wydawnictwo Wiedza Powszechna, Warszawa 1995
 A. Mazur, Order Krzyża Grunwaldu, Bellona Publishing House, Warszawa 1988
 S. Kisielewski, Abecadło Kisiela, Oficyna Wydawnicza, Warszawa 1990
 T. Mołdawa, Ludzie władzy 1944–1991, Wydawnictwo Naukowe PWN, Warszawa 1991
 B. Syzdek, Władysław Gomułka we wspomnieniach, Wydawnictwo Lubelskie, Lublin 1989
 A. Werblan, Władysław Gomułka, sekretarz generalny PPR, Książka i Wiedza, Warszawa 1988
 VI Kongres ZBoWiD Warszawa 7–8 maja 1979, Wydawnictwo ZG ZBoWiD, Warszawa 1979
 VII Kongres ZBoWiD'', Wydawnictwo ZG ZBoWiD, Warszawa 1985
 Za Wolność i Lud", nr 15 (1060) on April 14, 1984, s. 1

1914 births
1992 deaths
People from Vorpommern-Rügen
Polish communists
Polish trade unionists
Polish United Workers' Party members
Members of the Politburo of the Polish United Workers' Party
Members of the Central Committee of the Polish United Workers' Party
Ambassadors of Poland to Turkey
Recipients of the Order of the Builders of People's Poland
Recipients of the Order of the Banner of Work
Recipients of the Gold Cross of Merit (Poland)
Recipients of the Order of the Cross of Grunwald
Recipients of the Order of the Cross of Grunwald, 1st class
Burials at Powązki Military Cemetery